Richard Matuszewski (matt-too-CHef-ski), born September 7, 1964, in Newark, New Jersey, is a former tennis player from the United States.

Matuszewski won the Van Nostrand Memorial Award in 1986 and is a four-time All-American. He was named All-American in singles and doubles in 1985 and 1986. He ranks second on the Clemson Career List for most singles victories with 166 and fourth on the Clemson career list for most doubles victories with 125. He was a 1983 ACC Champion at number six singles, the 1984 ACC Champion at number five singles and the 1985 ACC Champion at number one doubles.

Matuszewski went on to play professional tennis for over a decade. On October 24, 1988, he reached his highest rank with the Association of Tennis Professionals (ATP), when he became World number 49.

ATP career finals

Singles: 1 (1 runner-up)

ATP Challenger and ITF Futures finals

Singles: 5 (2–3)

Doubles: 10 (4–6)

Performance timelines

Singles

Doubles

References

External links
 
 

1964 births
American male tennis players
Clemson Tigers men's tennis players
Sportspeople from Newark, New Jersey
Living people
Tennis people from New Jersey
American people of Polish descent